Anthony Hernandez (born October 18, 1993) is an American mixed martial artist currently competing as a Middleweight with the Ultimate Fighting Championship. A professional since 2014, he has also competed with Global Knockout and Legacy Fighting Alliance.

Background
Hernandez grew up in Dunnigan, California and graduated from Woodland High School in 2011. He wrestled in high school but got kicked out of the team because of grades. He attended college for a spell but dropped out to pursue a career in mixed martial arts.

Martial arts career

Amateur career
Hernandez made his amateur debut in 2010 during Ring of Fire 1, when he faced Michael Green Jr. He won the fight via unanimous decision. This would be the first win of an eight fight winning streak, which ended in a chance to fight for the King of the Cage Amateur Middleweight title, against Justin Jones. Hernandez lost the fight by submission in the first round.

Early career
In 2018, during LFA 32, Hernandez fought for the Legacy Fighting Alliance Middleweight title against Brendan Allen. Hernandez won a unanimous decision.

Fighting under the banner of Dana White's Contender Series 10, Hernandez faced Jordan Wright. Despite winning the fight in 40 seconds via knockout, the fight would be declared a no contest, as Hernandez tested positive for marijuana. He was penalized 15% of his purse and suspended for 6 months.

Ultimate Fighting Championship
Hernandez made his UFC debut on February 2, 2019, at UFC Fight Night: Assunção vs. Moraes 2 when he faced Markus Perez. He lost in the second round, by anaconda choke.

Hernandez faced Jun Yong Park on August 31, 2019, at UFC Fight Night: Andrade vs. Zhang. He won this fight by anaconda choke.

Hernandez faced Kevin Holland on May 16, 2020, at UFC on ESPN: Overeem vs. Harris.  He lost the fight after just 39 seconds, by TKO.

Hernandez was scheduled to face five-time Jiu-Jitsu World Champion Rodolfo Vieira on January 16, 2021, at UFC on ABC 1. However, Hernandez pulled out due to a positive COVID-19 test and they were rescheduled for UFC 258 on February 13, 2021. Hernandez won the fight via a guillotine choke in round two in a huge upset. This win earned him the Performance of the Night award.

Hernandez was scheduled to face Punahele Soriano on June 26, 2021, at UFC Fight Night 190. However, Hernandez was pulled from the event due to injury and was replaced by Brendan Allen at UFC Fight Night 192.

Hernandez was scheduled to face Dustin Stoltzfus on December 18, 2021, at UFC Fight Night 199. However, Hernandez withdrew from the event due to undisclosed reasons and was replaced by newcomer Caio Borralho.

Hernandez was scheduled to face Albert Duraev on April 9, 2022, at UFC 273. However, due to a rib injury, Duraev was pull from the event and he was replaced by Dricus du Plessis. Du Plessis was eventually moved to another matchup on the card and Hernandez was instead booked against Josh Fremd. He won the fight via unanimous decision.

Hernandez faced Marc-André Barriault on September 17, 2022 at UFC Fight Night: Sandhagen vs. Song. He won the fight via a submission in round three.

Hernandez is scheduled to face Edmen Shahbazyan on May 20, 2023 at UFC Fight Night 225.

Personal life
Hernandez has two children.

Championships and accomplishments
Ultimate Fighting Championship
Performance of the Night (One time) 
Legacy Fighting Alliance
LFA Middleweight Championship
Cageside Press
2021 Submission of the Year vs. Rodolfo Vieira
Jitsmagazine
2021 MMA Submission of the Year vs. Rodolfo Vieira
Combat Press
2021 MMA Submission of the Year vs. Rodolfo Vieira

Mixed martial arts record
 

|Win
|align=center|10–2 (1)
|Marc-André Barriault
|Technical submission (arm-triangle choke)
|UFC Fight Night: Sandhagen vs. Song
|
|align=center|3
|align=center|1:53
|Las Vegas, Nevada, United States
|
|-
|Win
|align=center|9–2 (1)
|Josh Fremd
|Decision (unanimous)
|UFC 273
|
|align=center|3
|align=center|5:00
|Jacksonville, Florida, United States
|
|-
|Win
|align=center|8–2 (1)
|Rodolfo Vieira
|Submission (guillotine choke)
|UFC 258
|
|align=center|2		
|align=center|1:53
|Las Vegas, Nevada, United States
|
|-
|Loss
|align=center|7–2 (1)
|Kevin Holland
|TKO (knees and punches)
|UFC on ESPN: Overeem vs. Harris
|
|align=center|1
|align=center|0:39
|Jacksonville, Florida, United States
|
|-
|Win
|align=center|7–1 (1)
|Jun Yong Park
|Submission (anaconda choke)
|UFC Fight Night: Andrade vs. Zhang
|
|align=center|2
|align=center|4:39
|Shenzhen, China
|
|-
|Loss
|align=center|6–1 (1)
|Markus Perez
|Submission (anaconda choke)
|UFC Fight Night: Assunção vs. Moraes 2
|
|align=center|2
|align=center|1:07
|Fortaleza, Brazil
|
|-
|NC
|align=center|6–0 (1)
|Jordan Wright
|NC (overturned)
|Dana White's Contender Series 10
|
|align=center|1
|align=center|0:40
|Las Vegas, Nevada, United States
|
|-
|Win
|align=center|6–0
|Brendan Allen
|Decision (unanimous)
|LFA 32
|
|align=center|5
|align=center|5:00
|Lake Charles, Louisiana, United States
|
|-
|Win
|align=center|5–0
|Mike Persons
|Submission (guillotine choke)
|GKO 9
|
|align=center|1
|align=center|1:54
|Jackson, California, United States
|
|-
|Win
|align=center|4–0
|Jumoke Hunter
|Submission (guillotine choke)
|GKO 7
|
|align=center|1
|align=center|3:09
|Jackson, California, United States
|
|-
|Win
|align=center|3–0
|Preston Snook
|Submission (guillotine choke)
|GKO 4
|
|align=center|1
|align=center|3:09
|Jackson, California, United States
|
|-
|Win
|align=center|2–0
|Kenny Ento
|Submission (guillotine choke)
|GKO 3
|
|align=center|1
|align=center|3:30
|Jackson, California, United States
|
|-
|Win
|align=center|1–0
|Trey Williams
|KO (punch)
|WFC 11: Mitchell vs. Major
|
|align=center|1
|align=center|0:51
|Sacramento, California, United States
|
|-

Amateur mixed martial arts record

|-
|Win
|align=center|9–1
|Eric Smith
|Submission (armbar)
|WFC 5 - Andrews vs. Griffin
|
|align=center|2
|align=center|0:43
|Sacramento, California, United States
|
|-
|Loss
|align=center|8–1
|Justin Jones
|Submission (rear-naked choke)
|KOTC - Fighting Legends
|
|align=center|1
|align=center|1:42
|Sacramento, California, United States
|
|-
|Win
|align=center|8–0
|Matt Wilson
|TKO (punches)
|WFC 4 - Huckaba vs. Williams
|
|align=center|1
|align=center|N/A
|Sacramento, California, United States
|
|-
|Win
|align=center|7–0
|Blake Smee
|TKO (punches)
|Ultimate Reno Combat 35
|
|align=center|3
|align=center|1:11
|Reno, Nevada, United States
|
|-
|Win
|align=center|6-0
|Randall Wallace
|Submission (rear-naked choke)
|Ultimate Reno Combat 33
|
|align=center|2
|align=center|1:48
|Reno, Nevada, United States
|
|-
|Win
|align=center|5–0
|Sean Nelson
|DQ
|Dawgs of War 06/22/12
|
|align=center|1
|align=center|1:00
|Roseville, California, United States
|
|-
|Win
|align=center|4–0
|Albert Townsend
|Submission (triangle choke)
|Ultimate Reno Combat - Fight Factory at the Knit 1
|
|align=center|1
|align=center|1:01
|Reno, Nevada, United States
|
|-
|Win
|align=center|3–0
|Jeremiah Johnson
|TKO (punches)
|Battle of the Titans II 
|
|align=center|1
|align=center|1:23
|Rancho Cordova, Nevada, United States
|
|-
|Win
|align=center|2–0
|Mike Ramos
|KO (knee to the body)
|URC 28 - Invincible
|
|align=center|2
|align=center|1:51
|Reno, Nevada, United States
|
|-
|Win
|align=center|1–0
|Michael Green Jr.
|Decision (unanimous)
|Ring of Fire 1
|
|align=center|3
|align=center|2:00
|Arcadia, California, United States
|
|-
|}

See also
List of current UFC fighters
List of male mixed martial artists

References

External links
 
 

American male mixed martial artists
1993 births
Living people
Ultimate Fighting Championship male fighters
Middleweight mixed martial artists
Mixed martial artists utilizing Brazilian jiu-jitsu
American practitioners of Brazilian jiu-jitsu
People from Yolo County, California
Mixed martial artists from California